Trapene Manor, formerly named Bormaņi Manor, is a manor house in Trapene Parish, Smiltene Municipality in the historical region of Vidzeme, in northern Latvia.

History 
Originally built at the beginning of the 19th century, red brick outer walls were added around 1890. In 1917, during World War I and onset of civil war in Russia,  property was abandoned by it owner Baron Voldemar  and started to quickly deteorate. Head of local school and also musician Eižens Vēveris envision use of abandoned house for artistic activities and convinced local authorities to save the property.  The building currently houses the Trapene parish cultural center and library.

See also
List of palaces and manor houses in Latvia

References

External links
  Bormaņi Manor
  Trapene Parish Tourism Sites

Manor houses in Latvia
Smiltene Municipality